Yanahuanca District is one of eight districts of the Daniel Alcides Carrión Province in the mountains of central Peru.

Geography 
The Rawra mountain range traverses the district. Some of the highest mountains of the district are listed below:

See also
 Daniel Alcides Carrión
 Pukamayu
 Warawtampu

References